Parahawking is an activity that combines paragliding with falconry. Birds of prey are trained to fly with paragliders, guiding them to thermals.

Parahawking was developed by British falconer Scott Mason in 2001, with the expert advice of Stephen Hawking, whose name was an inspiration for the activity. Mason began a round-the-world trip in Pokhara, Nepal, where many birds of prey – such as the griffon vulture, steppe eagle and black kite – can be found. While taking a tandem paragliding flight with British paraglider Adam Hill, he had the opportunity to see raptors in flight, and realised that he could combine the sports of paragliding and falconry.

The team started by training two black kites, but have since added two Egyptian vultures, Kevin and Bob, to the team. Only rescued birds are used – none of the birds have been taken from the wild.

Mason and Hill documented their endeavours, with help from colleague Graham Saunders-Griffiths, in a film entitled Parahawking. In addition to being named Best Debut Film at the 2003 Festival International du Film de Vol libre in St-Hilaire, France (held as part of the Coupe Icare), and winning top prize in the 'Air' category at the 5th Hory a Mesto international festival of mountain films in Slovakia, Parahawking was a finalist in the category of 'Best Film on Mountain Sports' at the 2003 Banff Mountain Film Festival, and competed for the title of 'Best Documentary' at the 2004 Cervino International Film Festival.

Mason's work has been featured in many publications around the world, from falconry-related journals and newsletters, to paragliding publications, mainstream magazines and newspapers.

Closure
Already in 2010 the Nepalese government announced that the Himalayan Raptor Rescue Centre in Pokhara is to be closed following allegations that it was illegally holding endangered birds and that the parahawking amounted to cruelty. Despite these allegations parahawking stayed operational in Pokhara until 2017.

In February 2017 Mason announced that parahawking has been shut down:

On 15 February 2017 Mason announced on his Facebook page that the last ever parahawking flight in Nepal was performed with the vulture Bob and the passenger Paula Graham.

Aftermath
The government of Nepal confiscated all birds. One of which was a booted eagle called Barry that had been given to the Parahawking Project for care by the British Embassy in Kathmandu after being mauled by a dog and had extensive feather damage. Barry was taken in by Kathmandu Central Zoo who insisted he was a black kite and eventually released him to a nearby forest despite not being able to fly at the time.

See also
 Birds of prey
 Falconry
 Paragliding
 Pokhara

References

External links
 Scott Mason's official Parahawking website
 Parahawking on YouTube—On the official Parahawking channel
 
 Share the Sky—Campaign to save Asia's Vultures (archive)

Air sports
Falconry
Hybrid sports
Individual sports
Paragliding